Florens Luoga is a Tanzanian lawyer and academic.

He is the deputy vice chancellor of the University of Dar es Salaam and the chair of the Tanzania Revenue Authority. He was the governor of the Bank of Tanzania, the country's central bank from 2018–2023.

References

1958 births
Living people
Governors of Bank of Tanzania
Academic staff of the University of Dar es Salaam
20th-century Tanzanian lawyers
University of Dar es Salaam alumni
Queen's University at Kingston alumni
Lund University alumni
Alumni of the University of Warwick